The second inauguration of Bill Clinton as president of the United States was held on Monday, January 20, 1997, at the West Front of the United States Capitol Building in Washington, D.C. This was the 53rd inauguration and marked the commencement of the second and final term of Bill Clinton as president and Al Gore as vice president. This was the most recent presidential inauguration to take place in the 20th century, the most recent in the 2nd millennium, and the first to be streamed live on the internet.

Inaugural ceremony 

Reverend Billy Graham gave an invocation to start the ceremony followed by the Pledge of Allegiance. Associate Justice of the Supreme Court of the United States Ruth Bader Ginsburg gave the oath to office for Vice President Al Gore. Jessye Norman, the famed Georgian opera singer, then serenaded the crowd with a medley of patriotic songs. Following the performance, surrounded by members of Congress dignitaries, Justices of the Supreme Court, family, and friends, Bill Clinton stood next to his daughter while his wife held the Bible. The oath to office was administered by Chief Justice William Rehnquist at 12:05 pm. The oath was ended with the traditional words, "So help me God." The National Anthem was sung by Santita Jackson, daughter of renowned civil rights activist Jesse Jackson, and then Arkansas poet Miller Williams read "Of History and Hope", a poem he wrote for the occasion. President Clinton's inaugural speech followed. The inauguration was celebrated that night by 14 different official galas held in honor of the President and First Lady.

January 20, 1997, was also Martin Luther King Jr. Day. The President's speech addressed King and his legacy as a champion of African-American rights and freedoms during the civil rights era. In addition, luncheon was held after the oath was taken at the Capitol's Statuary Hall that was based on traditional recipes from President Thomas Jefferson's era.

Miller Williams, a poet from Clinton's home state of Arkansas, penned the poem "Of History and Hope" especially for the day.

See also
First inauguration of Bill Clinton
Timeline of the Bill Clinton presidency (1997)
1996 United States presidential election
Bill Clinton 1996 presidential campaign

References

External links

Text of Clinton's Second Inaugural Address 
Video of Clinton's Second Inaugural Address from C-SPAN.org (with audio)
Audio of Clinton's Second Inaugural Address

1997 speeches
1997 in American politics
Inauguration 1997
United States presidential inaugurations
Inauguration 1997
1997 in Washington, D.C.
January 1997 events in the United States